"What the Future Holds" is a song recorded by British group Steps for their sixth studio album of the same name (2020).

Background and release
On 7 September 2020, Steps announced that they would release their sixth album What the Future Holds on 27 November, preceded by its title track, in addition to embarking on a United Kingdom arena tour in 2021. In a message released online, the group stated "We couldn't keep it a secret any longer!" It is their first album to be released with their new record label based in the United States, BMG.

The song "What the Future Holds" premiered on Zoe Ball's The Radio 2 Breakfast Show on 8 September and was released as the lead single the same day on download and streaming platforms.

A remix of the single by Cahill was released on 30 September.

The full version of the song (found as the last track on the digital version of the What the Future Holds album) features a solo verse shared by Faye Tozer & Lisa Scott Lee. The verse is cut on the Single Mix of the song.

Promotion

Music video
The official music video for "What the Future Holds" was filmed in London at the start of 2020 and premiered on 11 September. It was directed by Max Giwa and Dania Pasquini.

Live performances
Steps performed the single live for the first time on 18 September 2020 on BBC One's The One Show, featuring choreography from the official music video.

Composition
Written by Greg Kurstin and Sia, "What the Future Holds" lasts for a duration of three minutes and forty-nine seconds.

Track listing
Digital download/streaming
"What the Future Holds" (single mix) – 3:49

Digital Cahill Remix single
"What the Future Holds" (Cahill Remix) (Edit) – 3:18
"What the Future Holds" (Cahill Remix) – 6:52

Under My Skin Digital Single
"Under My Skin" – 3:31
"What the Future Holds" (single mix) – 3:49
"What the Future Holds" (Cahill Remix) (Edit) – 3:18
"What the Future Holds" (Alphalove Remix) (Edit) – 4:17

Remixes
"What the Future Holds" (Single Mix) - 3:48
"What the Future Holds" (Cahill Remix) [Edit] - 3:41
"What the Future Holds" (Alphalove Remix) [Edit] - 4:17
"What the Future Holds" (7th Heaven Remix) [Edit] - 4:14
"What the Future Holds" (Acoustic) - 4:22
"What the Future Holds" (Cahill Remix) - 6:51
"What the Future Holds" (Alphalove Extended Remix) - 5:18
"What the Future Holds" (7th Heaven Club Mix) - 6:25
"What the Future Holds" (Cahill Club Edit) - 4:47

Personnel
Adapted from Tidal.

Sia Furler – writer
Julian Gingell – producer, engineer, keyboard, programmer
Pete Hofmann – mixer
Greg Kurstin – writer
Lee Latchford-Evans – lead vocals
Claire Richards – lead vocals
Lisa Scott-Lee – lead vocals
Barry Stone – producer, engineer, keyboard, programmer
Faye Tozer – lead vocals
Ian "H" Watkins – lead vocals

Charts

References

2020 singles
2020 songs
Steps (group) songs
Songs written by Sia (musician)
Songs written by Greg Kurstin